Charlene is the 1977 debut album by Charlene. It gave her her first chart success with the second single "I've Never Been to Me", when the single reached #97 on the US Billboard Hot 100 singles chart in 1977, though the single did not really impact until re-released again in 1982, when the re-issued single reached #3 in the US, and #1 in the UK.

Track list
It Ain't Easy Comin' Down 3:38
I've Never Been To Me 4:05
Rings 3:02
Somewhere In My Life 4:30
I Want To Come Back As A Song 2:26
Hey Mama 4:00
I Love Every Little Thing About You 3:00
It's Really Nice To Be In Love Again 3:56
Shake A Hand 2:58
On My Way To You 3:56

References

1977 debut albums